The 2015 Santosh Trophy is the 69th edition of the Santosh Trophy, the main state competition in Indian football. 33 teams in total from around India entered the competition. Only 10 teams competed in the competition proper after going through the qualifiers. The tournament proper began on 1 March and will conclude with the final on 15 March.

Round and dates

Qualified teams

The following ten teams qualified for the Santosh Trophy proper.

 Assam 
 Delhi
 Goa
 Kerala
 Maharashtra
 Mizoram
 Punjab
 Railways
 Services
 West Bengal

Group stage

Group A

Group B

Semi-finals

Final

Goalscorers

4 Goals
  Raja Das (West Bengal)

3 Goals
  Rama Beshra (Services)

2 Goals

  Joerse Olivera (Goa)
  Marcus Masceranhas (Goa)
  Lalrinpuia (Mizoram)
  Shabaz Pathan (Maharashtra)
  Sunny (Punjab)
  Usman Ashik (Kerala)

1 Goal

  Prabhjot Singh (Punjab)
  Rajbir Singh (Punjab)
  Francis Zonuntulunga (Services)
  Anthony Chettri (Services)
  Rakesh Singh (Services)
  Vivek Kumar (Services)
  Jain P (Services)
  Nasrudheen Cheriyath (Kerala)
  V P Suhair  (Kerala)
  Lalbiakaua (Mizoram)
  Zico Zoremsanga (Mizoram)
  Malsawmfela (Mizoram)
  Sashi Toppo (Railways)
  Gabriel Fernandes (Goa)
  Sandesh Gadkari (Maharashtra)
  Baldeep Singh (Maharashtra)
  Vijith Shetty (Maharashtra)
  Suraj Mandal (Assam)

Notable players

References

External links
 AIFF website

 
Santosh Trophy seasons